Jarek Dymek (born January 21, 1971) is a Polish former strongman competitor. He competed in the World's Strongest Man event eight times, making the finals five times; his best finish was fourth in 2005. In the same year he won Europe's Strongest Man, his career best win. Dymek is also a three-time winner of the World's Strongest Team event, with his team-mate being five-time World's Strongest Man champion Mariusz Pudzianowski, for whom he is a training partner.

Personal Records
Squat - 340 kg (750 lbs.)
Deadlift - 380 kg (838 lbs.)
Bench press - 280 kg (618 lbs.)

References

1971 births
Living people
Polish strength athletes
People from Malbork
Sportspeople from Pomeranian Voivodeship
20th-century Polish people
21st-century Polish people